The following is a list of the 708 communes of the French department of Seine-Maritime.

The communes cooperate in the following intercommunalities (as of 2020):
Métropole Rouen Normandie
Communauté urbaine Le Havre Seine Métropole
Communauté d'agglomération Caux Seine Agglo
Communauté d'agglomération de Fécamp Caux Littoral
Communauté d'agglomération de la Région Dieppoise
Communauté de communes des 4 rivières (partly)
Communauté de communes interrégionale Aumale - Blangy-sur-Bresle (partly)
Communauté de communes Bray-Eawy
Communauté de communes Campagne de Caux
Communauté de communes Caux - Austreberthe
Communauté de communes de la Côte d'Albâtre
Communauté de communes Falaises du Talou
Communauté de communes Inter-Caux-Vexin
Communauté de communes de Londinières
Communauté de communes Plateau de Caux-Doudeville-Yerville
Communauté de communes Roumois Seine (partly)
Communauté de communes Terroir de Caux
Communauté de communes des Villes Sœurs (partly)
Communauté de communes Yvetot Normandie

References

Seine-Maritime